Mettle may refer to:

Mettle, see bravery.

Music 
Mettle (album), album by Hugo Largo 1989
"Mettle", a single by Leila from Blood Looms and Blooms
Icky Mettle, album by Archers of Loaf

Other uses
Mettle (comics), a Marvel Avengers character
Mettle the Mule, the mascot of the New York Mets

See also
Medal
Meddle
Metal